Rictulariidae is a family of nematodes belonging to the order Rhabditida.

Genera:
 Pseudorictularia Dollfus & Desportes, 1945
 Pterygodermatites Wedl, 1861
 Rictularia Frölich, 1802
 Rictularina Johnston & Mawson, 1941
 Rictularioides Hall, 1916

References

Nematodes